Hakan Demir (born 8 May 1998) is a Turkish professional footballer who plays as a midfielder for Iğdır.

Professional career
Demir is a product of the Kasımpaşa academy, joining them in 2008. He made his professional debut in a 3–2 Süper Lig win over Çaykur Rizespor on 11 August 2018. On 16 January 2019, Demir was loaned out to Sultanbeyi Belediyespor for the rest of the season.

References

External links
 
 
 

1998 births
People from Hafik
Living people
Turkish footballers
Association football midfielders
Kasımpaşa S.K. footballers
24 Erzincanspor footballers
1461 Trabzon footballers
Tarsus Idman Yurdu footballers
Süper Lig players
TFF Second League players
TFF Third League players